PRX-03140 is a partial agonist (18% relative to 5-HT) of the 5-HT4 receptor that was developed by EPIX Pharmaceuticals for Alzheimer's disease.

Epix Pharmaceuticals Inc (formerly Predix Pharmaceuticals Inc) was a pharmaceutical company based in Lexington, Massachusetts.  In 2009, Epix was in the process of asset liquidation due to insufficient funds to stay afloat. Nanotherapeutics, Inc. acquired the product in 2010 conducting one clinical study in PTSD patients. In 2018 the product was transferred to Nanoshift, LLC. Nanoshift LLC and Nanopharmaceutics, Inc. (www.nanopharmaceutics.com) continue to support clinical studies. It has been tested in six Phase 1 and Phase 2 clinical trials.

References

Carboxamides
Nootropics
1-Piperidinyl compounds
Serotonin receptor agonists
Thienopyridines
Isopropyl compounds